Oxiranol is an organic chemical that is an alcohol derivative of oxirane: it consists of a hydroxy group as substituent on ethylene oxide. It can have two enantiomeric forms. The compound has been proposed as an intermediate in the interstellar formation of glycolaldehyde (a constitutional isomer of oxiranol) and the oxidation of acrolein in the environment.

References 

Secondary alcohols
Epoxides